Jolgeh Rural District may refer to:
 Jolgeh Rural District (Hamadan Province)
 Jolgeh Rural District (Isfahan Province)
 Jolgeh Rural District (Razavi Khorasan Province)
 Jolgeh Rural District (Behabad County), Yazd province